Najbolji Hrvatski Tamburaši (in English Best Croatian Tambura Players) is a Croatian tambura group.

The group was formed in 1983 as Zlatni Dukati. After a tour of America organized by the Croatian Fraternal Union, the band started to compose more music about Croatia. This came to coincide with the Croatian War of Independence which brought such traditional music back into the spotlight.

In 1997 the group changed its name from Zlatni Dukati to Najbolji Hrvatski Tamburaši.  The band was signed to Croatia Records.

History
Zlatni Dukati's first album was titled Ni sokaci nisu što su nekad bili. The album was released by then Jugoton, now Croatia Records. The original band members were:
 Zoran Bucković-prim
 Stanko Šarić-basprim
 Zdravko Šljivac-basprim
 Zeljko Miloš (Yinks)-celo
 Mario Pleše-kontra
 Mato Lukačević-bas
 Marijan Majdak-Vocals

In the above-mentioned formation, Zlatni Dukati played only one season. Lukačević and Šarić continued to play under the name Zlatni Dukati. They were joined with group of tambura players from Štitar in Slavonia. The leader of this group was Šima Dominković and the other members were: Andrija Miličić, Mato Miličić, Mirko Gašparović, Josip Dominković, Mato Lukačević and Stanko Šarić. They were later joined by Hrvoje Majić.

For the next few years, Zlatni Dukati performed exclusively in Slavonia around Županja. In 1985, the group split due to internal problems.

In 1986, Lukačević and Stjepan Bogutovac reformed Zlatni Dukati. The band now consisted of:
 Petar Nikolić-violin
 Hrvoje Majić-basprim
 Mirko Gašparović-basprim
 Stjepan Bogutovac-basprim
 Mato Miličić(Pista)-kontra
 Mato Lukačević-bas

This group also performed around Županja. During 1986 and 19876, Zlatni Dukati played weekly at the "Tavern Kristal".  At the end of 1986, Šarić rejoined the band and Nikolić left it. During the summer of 1987, Zlatni Dukati started its first Croatian tour  with the help of music agency "Lira" from Cakovec. The band members for the tour were:

 Hrvoje Majić-prim
 Mirko Gašparović-basprim
 Stjepan Bogutovac-basprim
 Stanko Šarić-basprim
 Mato Miličić (Pista)-kontra
 Mato Lukačević-bas

In 1988, Zlatni Dukati started working with composer Josip Ivanković and released the album Nek zvone tambure. 
After disagreements with Ivanković, Bogutovac left the band. The rest of Zlatni Dukatiand Ivanković then released several successful albums.

During their tour of the United States, Zlatni Dukati decided to record an album of Croatian patriotic songs. The name of that album was Hrvatska Pjesmarica. This release was a great success and contributed to the popularization of tambura music.

During and after the war in 1991, Zlatni Dukati continued to record patriotic songs. That album was U meni Hrvatsk which reportedly boosted the morale of Croatian soldiers on the front lines.

In 1996, due to disagreements, Ivankovic ended his association with Zlatni Dukati. In 1997, due to litigation with Ivankovic, "Zlatni Dukati" changed its name to "Najbolji Hrvatski Tamburaši" . The band released the following albums under its new name: Vranac, Nek me pamte gradovi, Hrvatske pjesme iz Bosne i Hercegovine, Sedam dana, Divne godine, Tamburica od javora suva, Sretan Bozic, Nostalgija and Slavonijo, biseru Hrvatske.

In 1999 Majić committed suicide and was replaced by Denis Špegelj from Virovitica.  Celo player Krunoslav Golubičić also joined Najbolji Hrvatski Tamburaši

The current members of Najbolji Hrvatski Tamburaši include :

 Denis Špegelj-prim
 Mirko Gašparović-basprim
 Stanko Šarić-basprim
 Krunoslav Golubičić-celo
 Mato Miličić (Pista)-kontra
 Mato Lukačević-bas

Discography
 Nek zvone tambure – 1988
 Pjevaj kad dusa boli – 1989
 Hrvatska pjesmarica – 1989
 Dao bih zlatne dukate – 1990
 Horvatska domovina – 1990
 U meni Hrvatska – 1991
 Klasika – 1991
 16 zlatnih hitova – 1992
 Da su meni krila laka – 1993
 Sretan Bozic – 1993
 Starogradska pjesmarica – 1994
 Od dvora do dvora – 1994
 Suzivot – 1995
 Vranac – 1996
 Nek me pamte gradovi – 1998
 Hrvatske pjesme iz Bosne i Hercegovine – 1999
 Sedam dana – 2001
 Divne godine – 2003
 Tamburica od javora suva – 2004
 Sretan Bozic – 2005
 Nostalgija – 2007
 Zlatna kolekcija (Zlatni dukati) – 2007
 Zlatna kolekcija (Najbolji hrvatski tamburasi) – 2007
 Slavonijo, biseru Hrvatske – 2010

Croatian musical groups
Croatian folk musicians